Olga Orman (9 November 1943 – 7 March 2021) was a Dutch-Aruban writer, poet and storyteller. She wrote both in Papiamento and Dutch. Orman introduced kamishibai, a Japanese form of storytelling, to the Netherlands and the ABC islands.

Biography
Orman was born on 9 November 1943 in Noord, Aruba. At the age of 14, she left for the Netherlands. She received her teaching degree in Etten-Leur, and worked as an elementary school teacher in Curaçao for five years. Orman returned to the Netherlands, and started to teach in Amsterdam Bijlmermeer, a multi-cultural high-rise neighbourhood from the 1970s.

In 1994, Orman made her debut as a children's book writer with E biaha largo pa djeipei/De lange reis van hier tot om de hoek. She became known for two picture books about the spider Anansi. Omar started to write poetry for herself in the 1980s, and is best known for the 2014 poetry collection Cas di biento / Doorwaaiwoning.

As a teacher, Orman became aware of the frustration of children trying to express themselves in an unfamiliar language. She remembered that the oral tradition is still alive in Aruba, therefore, she started to introduce kamishibai, a Japanese form of storytelling with a miniature theatre, to the classroom.

In the Netherlands, Kinderboekenweek, a week dedicated to children's books, is organised since 1955. In 2004, Orman was knighted in the Order of Orange-Nassau.

Orman died on 7 March 2021 in Amsterdam, at the age of 77.

References

External links
2015 Aruban Kinderboekenweek picture book Translated by Olga Orman. (Free download courtesy of National Library of Aruba) 

1943 births
2021 deaths
Dutch educators
Dutch women educators
Dutch women writers
Dutch poets
Dutch women poets
Aruban women writers
Aruban writers
Aruban poets
Aruban women poets
Aruban children's writers
Women children's writers
Papiamento-language writers
People from Noord
Knights of the Order of Orange-Nassau